The First Pan-American Korfball Championship was held in Brazil from January 31 to February 2, with 3 national teams in competition. Originally 4 national teams were to compete until the withdrawal of Argentina (for financial reasons), so spare match fixtures were played against a second Brazil team, who played their matches out of the competition.

The tournament also served as an American qualifier for the 2015 Korfball World Championship, with the top nation qualifying for the world championship.

Group stage
The Group stage was held on January 31 and February 1.

|}
Key: G denotes win by golden goal.

Final
The Final was played on the 2nd of February.

1st place match
 20 - 10

Final standing

References

2014 in korfball